Azerbaijan competed at the 2017 World Championships in Athletics in London, United Kingdom, 4–13 August 2017.

Results

Men
Track and road events

Field events

Women
Field events

Nations at the 2017 World Championships in Athletics
2017
2017 in Azerbaijani sport